The Brains of Earth (also called Nopalgarth) is a science fiction story by Jack Vance published in 1966. It is about people who have a parasite called a "nopal" living in their brain. The nopals are undetectable to their hosts due to living on an alternate plane of reality. In the story, some people on faraway planets and on Earth have nopals. This is among many Cold War-era stories that used tales of alien takeovers of people's bodies as an allegory for the paranoia about Communist mind control of the West.

Plot
On the distant planet of Ixax, the inhabitants have just finished a destructive civil war. One group of Ixaxians, the Tauptu (who do not have nopals, a type of brain parasite), won the war against the Chitumih (who all have nopals). The Tauptu are pleased that they eradicated nopals on Ixax. Now they wish to eliminate nopals from people on other planets, with Earth's inhabitants being the first target. The challenge with removing nopals is that the host human may die, unless a device called the “denopalizer” is used to dislodge the parasite by inflicting terrible pain on the host.

To accomplish their plan of ridding Earth humans of their nopals, the Tauptu kidnap a scientist from Earth named Paul Burke. The aliens force Burke to create a denopalizer device so that Earth inhabitants can be “treated”. Burke is suspicious of the Tauptuians’ motivations and approach, because they do not seem interested in his ideas for denopalizers that do not involve torture. Burke investigates the nopals, and discovers that another brain parasite, the gher, still exists in the brains of the Tauptuians.

The Tauptu were correct in discovering that nopals exist, but they did not realize that nopals have little harmful impact on the hosts, or that nopals keep the host safe from the malignant coercion of the ghers. Burke invents an anti-gher helmet that incorporates a deceased nopal, which enables him to protect himself from the control of the gher. He then takes command of the Tauptuian spaceship and uses it to travel to gher's homeworld. Once there, he kills the gher.

1966 short stories
American science fiction short stories
Extraterrestrial life in popular culture
Short stories by Jack Vance